Tsikhistavi was a military-administrative official; the governor of castles (military administrative building) or small fortified cities and associated suburbs in feudal Georgia

Tsikhistavi in Mtskheta-Mtianeti were governing since the 6th century.  On the eave of the 7th century there were two Tsikhistavis, of Ateni and Mukhrani in Tbilisi.  At the same time there were two Tsikhistavis in the village of Khada (Mtiuleti).

In the document: "List of donations of King Bagrat III of Imereti to the Gelati Monastery" (dated by 1545), the Tsikhistavt-tsikhistavni of Kutaisi and Tsikhistavis of Likht-ameri and Likht-imeri are mentioned.

Tsikhistavis ruled cities and their garrisons(). For the small towns Thsikhistavi had the same function as an Amirta-amira in the bigger ones.

A Tsikhistavi's and his family rights were determined by Giorgi Brtskinvales codex (14th century). For killing a Tsikhistavi the convicted was penalized by 3500 tetri (tetri was Georgian currency of that period), expatriation for three years and confiscation of the manor.

Tsikhistavi's income sometimes was collected in the form of a special tax (Satsikhistavo). Tsikhistavis subordinated to the Eristavt-eristavi, Eristavi and Mouravi of a city. 
   
In the 17th and 18th centuries, Tsikhistavis sometimes are named as a Minibashi.

See also 
Satsikhistavo
Castellan

References 
 GSE, (1984) volume 11, page 237, Tbilisi.
 I. Dolidze, Georgian legal monuments, volume 1–3, Tbilis 1963–70

Medieval Georgia (country)
Nobility of Georgia (country)
Noble titles of Georgia (country)
Georgian words and phrases